Air Nepal International was an airline based in Kathmandu, Nepal operating international services to Kuala Lumpur, Doha, Dubai, and Bangkok. Founded in 2005, it ceased operations on 8 March 2006 after disagreement with lessor PBair.

History
The airline started services on 24 July 2005. All of its flights were suspended from 22 December 2005 without prior notice leaving 53 passengers stranded in Kathmandu. In 2007, the airline ultimately failed to resume its services.

Destinations
Air Nepal International regularly served the following destinations, which were cancelled either at the closure of operations or before:

Fleet
At the time of its closure, Air Nepal International operated the following aircraft:

References

Defunct airlines of Nepal
Airlines established in 2005
Airlines disestablished in 2006
2005 establishments in Nepal
2006 disestablishments in Nepal